The Northern Territory is the most sparsely populated state or territory in Australia. Despite its sparse population, it has a network of sealed roads which connect Darwin and Alice Springs, the major population centres, the neighboring states, and some other centres such as Uluru (Ayers Rock), Kakadu and Litchfield National Parks. Some of the sealed roads are single lane bitumen. Many unsealed (dirt) roads connect the remoter settlements.
Major roads are classified into three categories: National Highway, Arterial Roads, and Secondary Roads.

National Highways
There are three National Highways in the Northern Territory:

Arterial Roads
The following roads are classified as Arterial Roads:

Secondary Roads
The following roads are classified as Secondary Roads:
 Barkly Stock Route
 Buchanan Highway 
 Calvert Road
 Cox Peninsula Road 
 Daly River Road
 Darwin River Road
 Dorat Road 
 Ernest Giles Road
 Gun Point Road
 Jim Jim Road
 Larapinta Drive 
 Litchfield Road
 Luritja Road
 Mt Denison Road
 Nathan River Road
 Ranken Road
 Roper Highway
 Ross Highway
 Sandover Highway
 Savannah Way
 Tjukaruru Road

See also

 Highways in Australia for highways in other states and territories
 List of highways in Australia for roads named as highways, but not necessarily classified as highways
 List of road routes in the Northern Territory

References

 
 
Northern Territory
Highways
Highways